There Goes the Bride is a 1932 British comedy film directed by Albert de Courville and starring Jessie Matthews, Owen Nares, Carol Goodner, Basil Radford and Roland Culver. The screenplay concerns a woman who breaks off her an engagement and escapes to Paris. It is a remake of the German film Mary's Start in die Ehe, also known as Ich bleib' bei dir (1931). David Niven makes his film debut in a tiny uncredited role.

It was shot at Beaconsfield Studios. The film's sets were designed by the art director Norman Arnold.

There Goes the Bride was released on Region 2 DVD in 2009.

Plot
Running away from an arranged marriage, businessman's daughter Annette (Jessie Matthews) boards a train to Paris, only to have her bag stolen, and then herself suspected of theft by Max (Owen Nares), a wealthy young man sharing her carriage. Annette insists she was robbed, but cannot go into further detail because her picture is all over the newspapers, and she needs to escape. Max refuses to let her out of his sight until she can better explain, which she says she promises to do after 24 hours have passed. Farcical situations ensue, involving Max's fiance Cora (Carol Goodner), and all the while Max and Annette are falling in love.

Cast

 Jessie Matthews as Annette Marquand
 Owen Nares as Max
 Carol Goodner as Cora
 Charles Carson as Monsieur Marquand
 Barbara Everest as Madame Marquand
 Basil Radford as Rudolph
 Winifred Oughton as Housekeeper
 Jerry Verno as Clark, the chauffeur
 Roland Culver as Jacques
 Jack Morrison as Alphonse
 Mignon O'Doherty as Madame Duchaine
 Max Kirby as Pierre
 Gordon McLeod as Monsieur Duchaine
 Laurence Hanray as Police Chief
 George Zucco as Prosecutor
 Carroll Gibbons as himself
 Savoy Orpheans as Themselves
 David Niven as Minor role

Soundtrack
"I'll Stay with You", sung by Jessie Matthews

Critical reception
TV Guide gave the film one out of four stars, lamenting, "a series of barely funny screwball situations"; whereas Eye for Film wrote, "Matthews steals this bright little comedy. She has an effervescence and genuine likeability, which keep you watching," and concluded, "I would urge you to give this film a go - it is harmless fun."

References

External links 
 

1932 films
1932 musical comedy films
British musical comedy films
Films directed by Albert de Courville
British black-and-white films
British remakes of German films
Films set in Paris
Gainsborough Pictures films
British Lion Films films
Films shot at Beaconsfield Studios
Films scored by Fred Raymond
1930s English-language films
1930s British films